is the remains of a castle structure in Gotō, Nagasaki prefecture. Also well known as  "Fukue castle ". Construction started in 1849 and were completed in 1863.

The former Goto clan's residence and garden is in the ninomaru compound and its designated as a “National designation place of scenic beauty”. Goto Tourism and Historical Materials Museum is on site. 

The castle was listed as one of the Continued 100 Fine Castles of Japan in 2017.

Literature

References 

Castles in Nagasaki Prefecture
Ruined castles in Japan
History of Nagasaki Prefecture